Below are the results of season 1 of Poker Superstars Invitational Tournament.

Poker Superstars